Central Park Medical College (abbreviated as CPMC) is a private medical school (also called Medical College, in Pakistan) established in 2008 and located on Ferozepur Road, Lahore, Punjab, Pakistan. It is registered with PMDC, affiliated with UHS and approved by Ministry of Health. Bhatti International Teaching Hospital and Central Park Teaching Hospital are affiliated with the college as training hospitals.
Central Park Medical College is also recognized by World Health Organization and Foundation for Advancement of International Medical Education and Research.
Recently Central Park Medical college has launched DPT (Doctor of physical therapy) 5 years program affiliated with University of Health sciences Lahore (UHS).

Central Park medical college was categorized as A+ grade college on January 2, 2022, with allotment of 150 seats.

Faculty 
The college is known for its senior most faculty members including Prof.  Akhtar Sohail Chughtai who is the CEO of Central Park Medical College and Central Park Teaching Hospital, Lahore and CEO Chughtai Labs.

Departments 

 Basic science departments
 Anatomy
 Biochemistry
 Community medicine
 Forensic medicine
 Pathology
 Pharmacology
 Physiology
 Behavioural Sciences

 Medicine and allied departments
 Cardiology
 Dermatology
 Endocrinology & Metabolism
 General medicine
 Paediatrics
 Preventive medicine
 Psychiatry
 Pulmonology (Chest medicine)
 Urology

 Surgery and allied departments
 Anaesthesiology
 General surgery
 Obstetrics and Gynaecology
 Ophthalmology
 Orthopaedics
 Otorhinolaryngology
 Radiology

 Physical Therapy

Undergraduate programs 
 Bachelor of Medicine, Bachelor of Surgery (MBBS)

 * Doctor of physical Therapy (DPT)5 Years Program Affiliated with UHS (University of Health Sciences)
http://cpmcollege.edu.pk/cpcahs/index.php

Postgraduate programs 
 Fellow College of Physicians & Surgeons Pakistan (F.C.P.S) in Obstetrics and Gynaecology, Medicine, Surgery, Paediatrics, Anaesthesia.

External links 
 Official website
 BIT Hospital – official website
 - DPT CPMC official website

 Medical colleges in Punjab, Pakistan
 Universities and colleges in Lahore
2008 establishments in Pakistan